Stelios Venetidis (born 19 November 1976 in Orestiada) is a Greek former professional footballer who played as a defender. He used to play in the left-back position, but could be also used on the left side of midfield.

A very constant and composed player, his attributes gave him the chance to play for top class Greek football teams and be an important member for the Greece national team, playing also in three games at UEFA Euro 2004. He retired in May 2012.

Honours

PAOK
Greek Cup: 2000–01

Olympiacos
Alpha Ethniki: 2001–02, 2002–03, 2004–05, 2005–06
Greek Cup: 2004–05, 2005–06

AEL
Greek Cup: 2006–07

Greece
European Championship: 2004

External links
Official Larissa 1964 FC profile (in Greek)
Article for his transfer to Larissa (Greek) at Larissa's official website

1976 births
Living people
Sportspeople from Orestiada
Greek footballers
Association football defenders
UEFA Euro 2004 players
UEFA European Championship-winning players
Greece international footballers
Olympiacos F.C. players
Xanthi F.C. players
PAOK FC players
Athlitiki Enosi Larissa F.C. players
Super League Greece players
Footballers from Eastern Macedonia and Thrace